Naoko Kawashima (born 7 April 1981) is a Japanese synchronized swimmer who competed in the 2004 and 2008 Summer Olympics.

References

1981 births
Living people
Japanese synchronized swimmers
Olympic synchronized swimmers of Japan
Synchronized swimmers at the 2004 Summer Olympics
Synchronized swimmers at the 2008 Summer Olympics
Olympic silver medalists for Japan
Olympic medalists in synchronized swimming
Medalists at the 2004 Summer Olympics